Luch Stadium is a multi-use stadium in Gomel, Belarus. It is currently used mostly for football matches and is currently used by Gomel as a training facility. The stadium holds 5,000 spectators.

History
The stadium was opened in 1978 and has been used by various Gomel-based clubs. In 1993–1994 and 2000–2003 (while Gomel Central Stadium was closed for renovations), Luch Stadium was a primary home venue for FC Gomel in Belarusian Premier League. Post-2003, the stadium was used by FC Gomel reserves. Since 2010, the stadium has been in use as a training facility only.

References

External links
Stadium information at guidebook.by

Football venues in Belarus
Sport in Gomel
Buildings and structures in Gomel Region
FC Gomel